Khalid Mobarak Habeeb-Allah Alqurashi
was a citizen of Saudi Arabia.
He first became notable in 2003, when the government of Saudi Arabia listed him on the 2003 version of its Saudi list of most wanted terrorists.
He was killed in a shootout with Saudi security officials in April 2004.

References

Saudi Arabian Islamists
2004 deaths
Year of birth missing
Named on Saudi Arabia's list of most wanted suspected terrorists